Mark Stoops is a former Democratic member of the Indiana Senate who represented the 40th District from 2012 to 2020. He decided not to run for re-election to a third term. He was succeeded by fellow Democrat Shelli Yoder. Before being elected to the Indiana Senate, Stoops served as a Monroe County Commissioner. Stoops served on the commission from 1999 to 2006 and from 2008 to 2012, becoming a well-known opponent of Interstate 69. Stoops succeeded Vi Simpson, the former minority leader of the Democrats in the Indiana Senate. Stoops continues to oppose Interstate 69, and supports raising funding for public education.

References

External links
Project Vote Smart Profile
Legislative Page

Politicians from Bloomington, Indiana
County commissioners in Indiana
Democratic Party Indiana state senators
Living people
21st-century American politicians
Year of birth missing (living people)